The following is a list of pipeline accidents in the United States in 1995. It is one of several lists of U.S. pipeline accidents. See also: list of natural gas and oil production accidents in the United States.

Incidents 

This is not a complete list of all pipeline accidents. For natural gas alone, the Pipeline and Hazardous Materials Safety Administration (PHMSA), a United States Department of Transportation agency, has collected data on more than 3,200 accidents deemed serious or significant since 1987.

A "significant incident" results in any of the following consequences:
 Fatality or injury requiring in-patient hospitalization.
 $50,000 or more in total costs, measured in 1984 dollars.
 Liquid releases of five or more barrels (42 US gal/barrel).
 Releases resulting in an unintentional fire or explosion.

PHMSA and the National Transportation Safety Board (NTSB) post-incident data and results of investigations into accidents involving pipelines that carry a variety of products, including natural gas, oil, diesel fuel, gasoline, kerosene, jet fuel, carbon dioxide, and other substances. Occasionally pipelines are re-purposed to carry different products.

The following incidents occurred during 1995:
 1995 Since starting operations in 1954 until 1995, Yellowstone Pipeline had 71 leaks along the Flathead Indian Reservation in Montana, spilling  of petroleum products. Eventually, the Flathead refused to sign a new lease with Yellowstone.
 1995 A 26-inch gas transmission pipeline ruptured and burned near Castle Rock, Washington on March 6. There were no injuries.
 1995 On March 20, a natural gas transmission pipeline leaked and burned near Chipola, Louisiana. There were no injuries reported.
 1995 On March 27, a bulldozer operator ruptured a 40-inch gas transmission pipeline in Huntersville, North Carolina, causing an explosion. The operator was knocked off the bulldozer, then was run over by the driverless bulldozer.
 1995 On March 30, a Koch Industries pipeline ruptured in the parking lot of a church in Port Lavaca, Texas, spilling oil and benzine. Businesses nearby were evacuated. About 100 gallons of the mix was spilled. The failure was caused by Koch employees testing the pipeline under pressure, who thought the pipeline was full of only water.
 1995 Two Native Tribes of the Flathead Nation shut down the Right of Way agreements of Yellowstone Pipeline in Montana on April 21. Past spills on Tribal lands were cited as the reason. In 1999, it was revealed that Yellowstone had 78 leaks in the previous 45 years.
 1995 On May 12, a Sunoco pipeline leaked from excavation damage, in Pontotoc County, Oklahoma. About 14,000 gallons of petroleum product was spilled.
 1995 On December 2, 3 contractors were killed, and another injured, when a vacuum used to control flammable fumes accidentally reversed during welding at a pipeline facility near McCamey, Texas.
 1995 A bulldozer hit a 16-inch gas pipeline in North Attleboro, Massachusetts on December 9, forcing evacuations of a nearby shopping mall. An estimated 40,000 people were evacuated.
 1995 On December 19, a gas explosion at a twin dwelling in Norristown, Pennsylvania, killed 2 people and injured another person. Gas had migrated from a crack in a 6-inch cast iron gas main in the street.

References

Lists of pipeline accidents in the United States